Jefferson Davis Burkett (July 15, 1921 – October 24, 1947) was an American football player. He was a part of the Chicago Cardinals NFL championship team in 1947.  He died in a plane crash while returning to the team following surgery for appendicitis.

Pro career
After playing at LSU, Burkett was signed by the Cardinals. He was not only a punter for the Cardinals, but was also one of the team's receivers as well. Though his career only consisted of three games before his untimely death, Burkett had caught two passes for 44 yards and a touchdown. In addition to playing end and punter, Burkett also played as a defensive back, intercepting a pass and returning it for 25 yards.

Death

Burkett was suffering from appendicitis after a game against the Los Angeles Rams, who had beaten the Cardinals 27–7, handing Chicago their first loss of the season. Burkett opted to stay behind and have the surgery to remove his appendix. Once he was released from the hospital, Burkett boarded a United Airlines DC-6. The flight, United Air Lines Flight 608, crashed in Utah, killing all 52 people aboard. At the time of his death, Burkett was the league's leading punter. After Burkett's death, Cardinals quarterback Charley Trippi took over the punting duties. Trippi admitted taking over for Burkett was hard and he thought of his fallen teammate every time he punted in a game.

References

External links

1921 births
1947 deaths
American football wide receivers
LSU Tigers football players
Chicago Cardinals players
Players of American football from Mississippi
Sportspeople from Hattiesburg, Mississippi
Victims of aviation accidents or incidents in 1947
Victims of aviation accidents or incidents in the United States
Accidental deaths in Utah